Chinchali is a place in Belgaum district in India.

There is a famous temple of the goddess Mayakkadevi (Mahakali) in Chinchali.

Demographics
At the 2001 India census, Chinchali had a population of 15,949 (8,244 males and 7,705 females).

See also
 Belgaum
 Districts of Karnataka

References

External links
 http://Belgaum.nic.in/
 http://www.chinchalimayakkadevi.com

Villages in Belagavi district